Fuzhou (Fuzhounese: Hokchew, Hók-ciŭ), alternately romanized as Foochow, is the capital and one of the largest cities in Fujian province, China. Fuzhou lies between the Min River estuary to the south and the city of Ningde to the north. Together, Fuzhou and Ningde make up the Mindong linguistic and cultural region. 

Fuzhou's population was 7,115,370 as of the 2010 Census. Like other prefecture-level cities in China, its administrative area contains both urban and rural areas: in 2010, 61.95% of inhabitants (4,408,076) were urban, while 38.05% (2,707,294) were rural. As of 31 December 2018, the total population was estimated at 7,740,000 whom 4,665,000 lived in the built-up (or metro) area made of 5 urban districts plus Minhou County.
 In 2015, Fuzhou was ranked as the 10th fastest growing metropolitan area in the world by Brookings Institution.
Fuzhou is listed as No. 20 in China
Integrated City Index 2016's total ranking, a study conducted by National Development and Reform Commission.

Fuzhou is also a major city for scientific research, appearing in the global top 50 cities as tracked by the Nature Index. The city is home to several major universities, notably Fuzhou University, one of China's key universities and other public universities, including Fujian Normal University and Fujian Agriculture and Forestry University.

Names
Fuzhou is also known as "" in Chinese, meaning "a city of fortune". The Yuanhe Maps and Records of Prefectures and Counties, a Chinese geographical treatise published in the 9th century, says that Fuzhou's name came from Mount Futo a mountain northwest of the city. The mountain's name was then combined with -zhou, meaning "settlement" or "prefecture", in a manner similar to many other Chinese cities. During the Warring States period, the area of Fuzhou was sometimes referred to as Ye, and Fuzhou was incorporated into China proper during Qin dynasty. The city's name was changed numerous times between the 3rd and 9th centuries before finally settling on Fuzhou in 948. In Chinese, the city is sometimes referred to by the poetic nickname Rongcheng, .

In older English publications, the name is variously romanized as Foochow, Foo-Chow, Fuchow, Fūtsu, Fuh-Chow, Hock Chew, and Hokchew.

History

Pre-Qin history (before 221 BC)

The remains of two Neolithic cultures—the Huqiutou Culture, from around 5000 BC, and the Tanshishan Culture, from around 3000 BC—have been discovered and excavated in the Fuzhou area. During the Warring States period (c. 475–221 BC), Chinese began referring to the modern Fujian area as Min Yue, suggesting that the native inhabitants of the area were a branch of the Yue peoples, a diverse population of non-Chinese tribes who once inhabited most of southern China. In 306 BC, the Yue Kingdom (present-day Zhejiang) fell to the state of Chu. Han Dynasty historian Sima Qian wrote that the surviving members of the Yue royal family fled south to what is now Fujian, where they settled alongside the native Yue people, joining Chinese and Yue culture to create Minyue. Their major centre was not at Fuzhou's modern location, but further up the Min watershed near Wuyishan City.

Qin and Han dynasties (221 BC – AD 206)

The First Emperor of Qin unified ancient China in 221 BC and desired to bring the southern and southeast regions under Chinese rule. The Qin dynasty organized its territory into "Commanderies"—roughly equivalent to a province or prefecture—and the Fujian area was organized as Minzhong Commandery. The area seems to have continued mostly independent of Chinese control for the next century. The Han dynasty followed the short-lived Qin, and Emperor Gaozu of Han declared both Minyue and neighboring Nanyue to be autonomous vassal kingdoms. In 202 BC, Emperor Gaozu enfeoffed a leader named Wuzhu as King of Minyue, and a walled city called Ye (literally: Beautiful) was built. The founding of Ye in 202 BC has become the traditional founding date of the city of Fuzhou.

In 110 BC, the armies of Emperor Wu of Han defeated the Minyue kingdom's armies during the Han–Minyue War and annexed its territory and people into China. Many Minyue citizens were forcibly relocated into the Jianghuai area, and the Yue ethnic group was mostly assimilated into the Chinese, causing a sharp decline in Ye's inhabitants. The area was eventually re-organized as a county in 85 BC.

Three Kingdoms to Sui dynasty (200–618)
During the Three Kingdoms Period, southeast China was nominally under the control of Eastern Wu, and the Fuzhou area had a shipyard for the coastal and Yangtze River fleets. In 282, during the Jin dynasty, two artificial lakes known simply as the East Lake and West Lake were constructed in Ye, as well as a canal system. The core of modern Fuzhou grew around these three water systems, though the East and West Lakes no longer exist. In 308, during the War of the Eight Princes at the end of the Jin dynasty, the first large-scale migration of Chinese immigrants moved to the south and southeast of China began, followed by subsequent waves during later periods of warfare or natural disaster in the Chinese heartland. The administrative and economic center of the Fujian area began to change to the Ye area during the Sui dynasty (581–618).

Tang to the ten kingdoms era (618–960)
In 725, the city was formally renamed "Fuzhou". Throughout the mid-Tang dynasty, Fuzhou's economic and cultural institutions grew and developed. The later years of the Tang saw a number of political upheavals in the Chinese heartland such as the An Lushan Rebellion and Huang Chao Rebellion, prompting another wave of northerners to immigrate to the modern-day Northern Min and Eastern Min areas. In 879, a large part of the city was captured by the army of Huang Chao during their rebellion against the Tang government. In 893, the warlord brothers Wang Chao and Wang Shenzhi captured Fuzhou in a rebellion against the Tang dynasty, successfully gaining control of the entire Fujian Province and eventually proclaiming their founding of an independent kingdom they called the Min Kingdom in 909. The Wang brothers enticed more immigrants from the north, though their kingdom only survived until 945. In 978, Fuzhou was incorporated into the newly founded Song dynasty, though their control of the mountainous regions was tenuous.

Fuzhou prospered during the Tang dynasty. Buddhism was quickly adopted by citizens who quickly built many Buddhist temples in the area.

Song era (960–1279)
Fuzhou underwent a major dramatic surge in its refined culture and educational institutions throughout the Song Dynasty as Fuzhou produced 10 Fuzhounese zhuangyuan scholars (scholar who is ranked the top first place in the imperial examinations), a large number for a small city in the country during that dynasty.

The "Hualin" Temple (not to be confused with the temple of the same name in Guangzhou), founded in 964, is one of the oldest and surviving wooden structures in China. New city walls were built in 282, 901, 905, and 974, so the city had many layers of walls – more so than the Chinese capital. Emperor Taizong of the Song dynasty ordered the destruction of all the walls in Fuzhou in 978 but new walls were rebuilt later. The latest was built in 1371. During the Southern Song dynasty, Fuzhou became more prosperous; many scholars came to live and work. Among them were Zhu Xi, the most celebrated Chinese philosopher after Confucius, and Xin Qiji, the greatest composer of the ci form of poetry.

Marco Polo, an Italian guest of the Emperor Kubilai, transcribed, after the conventions of Italian orthography, the place name as Fugiu. This was not the local Min pronunciation but that of the mandarin administrative class.

According to Odoric of Pordenone, Fuzhou had the biggest chickens in the world.

Ming dynasty (1368–1644)
Between 1405 and 1433, a fleet of the Ming Imperial navy under Admiral Zheng He sailed from Fuzhou to the Indian Ocean seven times; on three occasions the fleet landed on the east coast of Africa. Before the last sailing, Zheng erected a stele dedicated to the goddess Tian-Fei (Matsu) near the seaport.

The Ming government gave a monopoly over Philippine trade to Fuzhou, which at times was shared with Quanzhou.

Galeote Pereira, a Portuguese soldier and trader, was taken prisoner during the pirate extermination campaign of 1549 and imprisoned in Fuzhou. Later transferred to a form of internal exile elsewhere in the province, Pereira escaped to Langbaijiao in 1553. The record of his experiences in the Ming Empire, logged by the Jesuits at Goa in 1561, was the first non-clerical account of China to reach the West since Marco Polo.

The Ryukyu Kingdom established an embassy in Fuzhou.

Qing dynasty (1644–1912)

In 1839, Lin Zexu, who himself was a Fuzhou native, was appointed by the Daoguang Emperor to enforce the imperial ban on the opium trade in Canton. His unsuccessful actions, however, precipitated the disastrous First Opium War with Great Britain, and Lin, who had become a scapegoat for China's failure in war, was exiled to the northwestern section of the empire. The Treaty of Nanjing (1842), which put an end to the conflict, made Fuzhou (then known to Westerners as Foochow) one of five Chinese treaty ports, and it became completely open to Western merchants and missionaries.

Fuzhou was one of the most important Protestant mission fields in China. On January 2, 1846, the first Protestant missionary, Rev. Stephen Johnson (missionary) from ABCFM, entered the city and soon set up the first missionary station there. ABCFM was followed by the Methodist Episcopal Missionary Society that was led by Revs. M. C. White and J. D. Collins, who reached Fuzhou in early September 1847. The Church Missionary Society also arrived in the city in May 1850. These three Protestant agencies remained in Fuzhou until the communist revolution in China in the 1950s, leaving a rich heritage in Fuzhou's Protestant culture. They supported the creation of hospitals and schools, including the Woolston Memorial Hospital, run by the American-trained Hü King Eng.

On August 23, 1884, the Battle of Fuzhou broke out between the French Far East Fleet and the Fujian Fleet of the Qing dynasty. As the result, the Fujian Fleet, one of the four Chinese regional fleets, was destroyed completely in Mawei Harbor.

Republic of China 
On November 8, 1911, revolutionaries staged an uprising in Fuzhou. After an overnight street battle, the Qing army surrendered.

Revolutionary Republic
On November 22, 1933, Eugene Chen and the leaders of the National Revolutionary Army's 19th Army set up the short-lived People's Revolutionary Government of Republican China. Blockaded by Chiang Kai-shek and left without support from the nearby Soviet Republic of China, the PRGRC collapsed within two months.

Japanese occupation

With the outbreak of the Sino-Japanese War in 1937, hostilities commenced in Fujian Province. Xiamen (Amoy) fell to a Japanese landing force on May 13, 1938. The fall of Amoy instantly threatened the security of Fuzhou. On May 23, Japanese ships bombarded Mei-Hua, Huang-chi and Pei-Chiao while Japanese planes continued to harass Chinese forces. Between May 31 and June 1, Chinese gunboats Fu-Ning, Chen-Ning and Suming defending the blockade line in the estuary of the Min River were successively bombed and sunk. Meanwhile, the Chinese ship Chu-Tai berthed at Nan-Tai was damaged. The Chinese Navy's Harbor Command School, barracks, shipyard, hospital and marine barracks at Ma-Wei were successively bombed. Fuzhou is recorded as having fallen to Japanese forces in 1938.

The extent of Japanese command and control of the city of Fuzhou itself as opposed to the port at Mawei and the Min River Estuary is uncertain. By 1941 (5/7), the city is recorded as having returned to Nationalist control. The British Consulate in Fuzhou is noted as operational from 1941 to 1944 after the United Kingdom Declaration of War on Japan in December 1941. Western visitors to Fuzhou in the period 1941–1944 include the Australian journalist Wilfred Burchett in 1942 and the British scientist Joseph Needham in May 1944. Both visitors record the presence of a British Consul and a Fuzhou Club comprising western businessmen.

In The Man Who Loved China: The Fantastic Story of the Eccentric Scientist Who Unlocked the Mysteries of the Middle Kingdom, author Simon Winchester relates the visit of Dr Needham in 1944. Needham encountered the American government agent (John Caldwell) and the British SIS agent (Murray MacLehose working undercover as the British Vice-Consul in Fuzhou) involved in aid to the Nationalist resistance to Japanese forces in Fujian Province.

As part of Operation Ichi-Go (1944), the last large-scale Japanese offensive in China in World War II, Japanese troops intended to isolate Fuzhou and the Fujian Province corridor to Nationalist forces in western China and the wartime capital of Chongqing. One account of Japanese troops re-taking of Fuzhou city itself is narrated by American naval officer, Houghton Freeman. The date is given as October 5, 1944.

Fuzhou remained under Japanese control until the surrender of Japan and its armed forces in China in September 1945.

Following the restoration of Republic control (1946), the administration divisions of Fuzhou were annexed, and administration level was promoted from county-level to city-level officially.

People's Republic of China

Fuzhou was occupied by the People's Liberation Army with little resistance on 17 August 1949.
In the 1950s, the city was on the front line of the conflict with the KMT in Taiwan, as hostile KMT aircraft frequently bombed the city. The bombing on 20 January 1955 was the most serious one, killing hundreds of people.

Fuzhou was also involved in violent mass chaos during the Cultural revolution. Different groups of Red Guards fought with each other using guns on the streets of the city, and even attacking the People's Liberation Army.

Under the reform and opening policy since the late 1970s, Fuzhou has developed rapidly. In 1982, Fuzhou became the first city in China where the stored program control was introduced, which marked a milestone in the history of telecommunications in China. In 1984, Fuzhou was chosen as one of the first branches of Open Coastal Cities by the Central Government.

On December 13, 1993, a raging fire swept through a textile factory in Fuzhou and claimed the lives of 60 workers.

On October 2, 2005, floodwaters from Typhoon Longwang swept away a military school, killing at least 80 paramilitary officers.

Geography

Fuzhou is located in the northeast coast of Fujian province, connects jointly northwards with Ningde and Nanping, southwards with Quanzhou and Putian, westwards with Sanming respectively.

Climate
Fuzhou has a humid subtropical climate (Köppen Cfa) influenced by the East Asian Monsoon; the summers are long, very hot and humid, and the winters are short, mild and dry. In most years, torrential rain occurs during the monsoon in the second half of May. Fuzhou is also liable to typhoons in late summer and early autumn. With monthly percent possible sunshine ranging from 24 percent in March to 54 percent in July, the city receives 1,607 hours of bright sunshine annually.
Snow is very rare, having covered the ground last times in February 1957, December 1975 and December 1991.

Administrative divisions

The administrative divisions of Fuzhou have been changed frequently throughout history. From 1983, the Fuzhou current administrative divisions were formed officially, namely, 5 districts and 8 counties. In 1990 and 1994, Fuqing and Changle counties were promoted to county-level cities; Changle became a district in 2017. Despite these changes, the administrative image of "5 districts and 8 counties" is still held popularly among local residents. Fuzhou's entire area only covers 9.65 percent of Fujian Province.

The city of Fuzhou has direct jurisdiction over 6 districts, 1 county-level city, and 6 counties:

Culture

The City of Banyans is distinct from the mainstream inland cultures of central China, and in details vary from other areas of the Chinese coast.

Language and art
Besides Mandarin Chinese, the majority local residents of Fuzhou (Fuzhou people) also speak Fuzhou language, the prestige form of Eastern Min.

Min opera, also known as Fuzhou drama, is one of the major operas in Fujian Province. It enjoys popularity in the Fuzhou area and in neighboring parts of Fujian such as the northeast and northwest areas where the Fuzhou language is spoken, as well as in Taiwan and the Malay Archipelago. It became a fixed opera in the early 20th century. There are more than 1,000 plays of Min opera, most of which originate from folk tales, historical novels, or ancient legends, including such traditional plays as "Making Seal", "The Purple Jade Hairpin" and "Switching Fairy Peach with Litchi".

Architecture

Religion
The two traditional mainstream religions practiced in Fuzhou are Mahayana Buddhism and Taoism. Traditionally, many people practice both religions simultaneously. The city is also home to many Buddhist monasteries, Taoist temples and Buddhist monks.

Apart from mainstream religions, a number of religious worship sites of various local religions are situated in the streets and lanes of Fuzhou.

The origins of local religion can be dated back centuries. These diverse religions incorporated elements such as gods and doctrines from other religions and cultures, such as totem worship and traditional legends. For example, Monkey King, originated to monkey worship among local ancients, gradually came to embody the God of Wealth in Fuzhou after the novel Journey to the West was issued in Ming dynasty.

As the most popular religion in the Min River Valley, the worship of Lady Linshui is viewed as one of the three most influential local religions in Fujian, the other two being the worship of Mazu and Baosheng Dadi.

Local cuisine

Fuzhou cuisine is most notably one of the four traditional cooking styles of Fujian cuisine, which in turn is one of the eight Chinese regional cuisines. Dishes are light but flavorful, with particular emphasis on umami taste, known in Chinese cooking as xianwei, as well as retaining the original flavor of the main ingredients instead of masking them. In Fuzhou cuisine, the taste is light compared to that of some other Chinese cooking styles, and often have a mixed sweet and sour taste. Soup, served as an indispensable dish in meals, is cooked in various ways with local seasonal fresh vegetables and seafood and often added with local cooking wine.

Fuzhou is famous for its street food and snacks.  Some notable street food dishes include Fuzhou fish balls, meat-pastry dumplings, oyster cake (海蛎饼), rice scroll soup, guong bian (a kind of mildly savory pastry), Buddha Jumps over the Wall (佛跳墙),and pork floss. Many of these street food dishes have a long history and their own local legend; an example would be the oyster cake, according Fuzhou local folklore, in the early Qing dynasty, there was a young man who inherited his father's dim sum business, despite all his hard works, he only managed to earn enough money to feed himself, not enough to raise and feed a family of his own. One night, he dreamt of a silver-haired elderly man, who told him that he has very good fortune, the young man then asked him what he can do to obtain good luck, the elderly man then floated away. That's when the young man notice the setting moon, and after the moon sank under the clouds, rose from the east a golden sun, he was inspired by the dream and invented oyster cake, which is white like the moon before being lowered into hot grease and coming out golden as the morning sun. According to the legend, after the young man made a fortune out of his invention and his oyster cake was imitated by many others, which was passed down till this day. another example of a Fuzhou street food with a long history is rice scroll soup, which became popular in Fuzhou in the early part of the Qing dynasty.  As more Fuzhou residents settled overseas, Fuzhou dishes spread to Taiwan, Southeast Asia and the U.S..  For example, one is able to find guong bian and Fuzhou fish balls in Sitiawan in Ipoh, Malaysia while Fuzhou fish balls, meat-pastry dumplings and rice scroll soup can be found in New York's Chinatown.

Fuzhou residents also enjoy eating festival foods during traditional Chinese holidays.  For example, red and white rice cakes are served over Chinese New Year, tangyuan (汤圆) during the Lantern Festival, zongzi during the Dragon Boat Festival, and sweet soy bean powder-covered plain yuanxiao over the winter solstice.

Olive juice is also a much sought-after refreshment. Ganlanzhi (橄榄汁) is cloudy and light yellowish-green in color. Olive trees grown on the Canarium album tree in Fuzhou since the Tang Dynasty, it was even approved as a trademark with geographic indication by China in 2010. Not found elsewhere in China, ganlanzhi (橄榄汁) is also a reminder of the many regional differences in China when it comes to food.

Special crafts
Bodiless lacquerware, paper umbrellas and horn combs are the "Three Treasures" of Fuzhou traditional arts. In addition, bodiless lacquerware, together with cork pictures and Shoushan stone sculptures are called "Three Superexcellences" of Fuzhou.

Media
Fuzhou Evening News, Strait Metropolitan Post and Southeast Express are the three most primary newspapers in the city. Fuzhou Daily is the official newspaper of the Fuzhou Committee of Chinese Communist Party. FZTV, the local municipal television station has four channels. As the capital, the provincial state-owned Fujian Media Group, Fujian Daily Newspaper Group and Straits Publishing & Distributing Group also headquarter here.

Transportation

Airports

The city is served by Fuzhou Changle International Airport, which replaces Fuzhou Yixu Airport, the old airfield. The former is its main international airport and an air-hub in southeast China, while the latter was turned into a PLA airbase after 1997.

Railways

Fuzhou is a railway hub in northern Fujian.
The Nanping–Fuzhou Railway and Xiangtang–Putian Railway provide rail access inland. The regional Fuzhou-Mawei Cargo Railway runs from the Fuzhou Railway Station eastward to the port in Mawei District. Fuzhou has two main railway stations, Fuzhou and Fuzhou South. Fuzhou station is often just referred to as Fuzhou station given its central location.

Metro

Fuzhou Metro is the first rapid transit system in Fujian province, has two metro lines in operation, the first line opened linking the south of the city and the north above the Min River, and five lines under construction.

Line 1 links the two railway stations of the city. The Fuzhou railway station is located north of the city center, near the North Second Ring Road. Fuzhou South Railway Station, located in Cangshan district, is a key landmark of the New City development scheme, begun in 2007 and completed in 2010. Line 1 was opened on May 18, 2016.

Line 2 runs in the east–west direction of the city, linking the university city and Fuzhou High-Tech Zone in Minhou county, Jinshan Industrial Zone in Cangshan district, and Gushan mountain in Jin'an district. Line 2 was opened on 26 April 2019.

Seaport

Passenger liners regularly sail between ROC's Matsu Islands and the port in Mawei District.

A high-speed ferry sails across Taiwan Strait between the port in Pingtan County, the mainland's closest point to Taiwan, to Taipei and Taichung, a trip that takes about 3 hours.

History of Fuzhou port
In 1867 the Fuzhou seaport was the site of one of China's first major experiments with Western technology, when the Fuzhou Navy Yard was established. A shipyard and an arsenal were built under French guidance and a naval school was opened. A naval academy was also established at the shipyard, and it became a center for the study of European languages and technical sciences. The academy, which offered courses in English, French, engineering, and navigation, produced a generation of Western-trained officers, including the famous scholar-reformer Yan Fu (1854–1921).

The yard was established as part of a program to strengthen China in the wake of the country's disastrous defeat in the Second Opium War (1856–1860). Most talented students nonetheless continued to pursue a traditional Confucian education, and by the mid-1870s the government began to lose interest in the shipyard, which had trouble securing funds and declined in importance. Fuzhou remained essentially a commercial center and a port until World War II; it had relatively little industry. The port was occupied by the Japanese during 1940–1945.

Since 1949, Fuzhou has grown considerably. Transportation has been improved by the dredging of the Min River for navigation by medium-sized craft upstream to Nanping. In 1956 the railway linking Fuzhou with the interior of the province and with the main Chinese railway system began operation. The port has also been improved; Fuzhou itself is no longer accessible to seagoing ships, but Luoxingta anchorage and the outer harbor at Guantou on the coast of the East China Sea have been modernized and improved. The chief exports are timber, fruits, paper, and foodstuffs.

Economy

Industry is supplied with power by a grid running from the Gutian hydroelectric scheme in the mountains to the northwest. The city is a center for commercial banking, designer brands and timber-working, engineering, papermaking, printing, and textile industries. A small iron and steel plant was built in 1958. In 1984 Fuzhou was designated one of China's "open" cities in the new open-door policy inviting foreign investments. Handicrafts remain important in the rural areas, and the city is famous for its lacquer and wood products.

Its GDP was ¥75,614 (c. US$12,140) per capita in 2015, ranked no. 52 among 659 Chinese cities.

Fuzhou is undoubtedly the province's political, economic and cultural center as well as an industrial center and seaport on the Min River. In 2008, Fuzhou's GDP amounted to ¥228.4 billion, an increase of 13 percent.

Manufactured products include chemicals, silk and cotton textiles, iron and steel, and processed food. Among Fuzhou's exports are fine lacquerware and handcrafted fans and umbrellas. The city's trade is mainly with Chinese coastal ports.

In 2008, exports reached US$13.6 billion, a growth of 10.4 percent while imports amounted to US$6.8 billion. Total retail sales for the same period came to ¥113.4 billion and per capita GDP grew to ¥33,615. During the same period, Fuzhou approved 155 foreign-invested projects. Contracted foreign investment amounted to US$1.489 billion, while utilized foreign investment increased by 43 percent to US$1.002 billion.

Economic and technological zones

Fuzhou Economic & Technological Development Zone
It is located close to Fuzhou Changle International Airport and Fuzhou Port. Industries encouraged in the zone include electronics assembly and manufacturing, telecommunications equipment, trading and distribution, automobile production/assembly, medical equipment and supplies, shipping/warehousing/logistics, and heavy industry.

Fuzhou Export Processing Zone
The Fuzhou Export Processing Zone was founded on June 3, 2005, with the approval of the State Council and enjoys all the preferential policies.

Fuzhou Free Trade Zone
Industries encouraged in the free trade zone include electronics assembly and manufacturing, heavy industry, instruments and industrial equipment production, shipping/warehousing/logistics, telecommunications equipment, trading, and distribution.

Fuzhou High-Tech Industrial Development Zone

Fuzhou High-tech Development Zone was set up in 1988 and approved by the State Council in March 1991. The Administrative Commission of Mawei High-tech Park was set up in the zone in 1999.

Fuzhou Science and Technology Park
The Fuzhou Science and Technology Park was established in 1988 and was approved to be a national-level zone by the State Council in 1991. The main industries are electronics, information technology, and biotechnology.

Fuzhou Taiwan Merchant Investment Area
The Fuzhou Taiwan Merchants Development Zone was approved to be established in May 1989 by the State Council. The zone is located in the Fuzhou Economic and Technological Development Zone. The zone is a commercial base for Taiwan-related development. The main industries are IT, metallurgy, food processing, and textiles.

Cityscape

Tourist attractions

Historical / cultural
Sanfang Qixiang "Three Lanes and Seven Alleys" is a cluster of ancient residential buildings dating from the late Jin dynasty now features a pedestrian zone with shops along the street. Situated at the centre of the city at Gulou District, it is the most popular touristic destination in the city. Many buildings were revitalized recently to increase tourism.

Lin Zexu Memorial Hall (Aomen Rd)
 West Lake (An artificial landscape-style lake built in 282)
Hualin Temple (Built in 964, Song dynasty) Its main hall is known as the oldest surviving wooden building in south China and was confirmed as an important heritage site under state protection in 1982.
 Dizang Temple (The Temple of Sacrificing Guardian of the Earth, founded in 527)
 Xichan Temple (Founded in 867)
 Wu Ta "Black Pagoda" (Originally built in 799, rebuilt in 936)
 Bai Ta "White Pagoda" (On the top of Mount Yu, originally built in 905, 67 m in height, collapsed in 1534, rebuilt in 1548, 41 m in height)
 Yongquan Temple (Founded in 915, and located on the top of Mount Gu)
 Mount Gu, the tallest mountain in the area. Attracts many residents, especially in the weekends for hiking trips.
 Mount Qi (In Nanyu, Minhou County.)
 Luoxing Tower (In Mawei District and built in the Song dynasty. Was called "China Tower")
 Tanshishan cultural relics (In Ganzhe, Minhou County)
Saint Dominic's Cathedral (福州圣多明我主教座堂)
St. John's Church, Fuzhou 
Jinshan Temple (金山寺) (Originally built in 1131–1162, rebuilt in 1934)

Recreational

 Fujian Museum (Near West Lake)
 Wulongjiang Shidi Park (A wetland park. However, the park is in distress due to ineffective environmental protection and construction)
Beach Park
Chating Park
 Zuohai Park
 Minjiang Park (On the two banks of the Min River)
 Pingshan Park
 Mount Jinniu Park (Near the Fuzhou West Long-Distance Bus Station)
 Mount Jinji Park
 Fuzhou National Forest Park
 Sandiejing Forest Park
 Fuzhou Hot Spring Park
 Fuzhou Zoo (This new zoo was built in 2008 after moving from its old location by West Lake)

Notable people

 Sa Zhenbing (1859–1952), high-ranking naval officer of Mongolian origin
 Go Seigen (1914–2014), Weiqi/Go player, considered by many players to be the greatest player of the game in the 20th century and one of the greatest of all time
 Lin Changmin (1876–1925), a high-rank governor in the Beiyang Government
 Lin Huiyin (1904–1955), architect and writer
 Lin Juemin (1887–1911), one of 72 Revolutionary Martyrs at Huanghuagang, Guangzhou
 Murong Shenxing (1934–2018), neuroscientist, researcher and doctor
 Ingen (1592–1673), well known Buddhist monk, poet and calligrapher who lived during Ming Dynasty
 Baizhang Huaihai (720–814), an influential master of Zen Buddhism during the Tang Dynasty
 Huangbo Xiyun (died 850), an influential master of Zen Buddhism during the Tang Dynasty
 Chen Youding (1330–1368), a prominent military leader during the Yuan Dynasty
 Gao Bing (1350–1423), an author and poetry theorist during the Ming Dynasty
 Zhang Jing (1492–1555), a prominent military leader during the Ming Dynasty
 Zheng Xiaoxu (1860–1938), statesman, diplomat and calligrapher
 Liang Hongzhi (1882–1946), a high-rank governor in the Beiyang Government
 Chen Baochen (1848–1935), scholar and loyalist to the Qing dynasty
 Chih-Tang Sah (born 1932), Chinese-American engineer of Mongolian origin
 Chen Shaokuan (1889–1969), Fleet Admiral who served as the senior commander of naval forces of the National Revolutionary Army
 Bing Xin (1900–1999), writer
 Zheng Zhenduo (1898–1958), journalist and literary scholar
 Zou Taofen (1895–1944), journalist, media entrepreneur, and political activist
 Zhan Shi Chai (1840s–1893), entertainer as "Chang the Chinese Giant"
 Huang Naishang (1849–1924), Christian scholar, and founding father of Malaysian town of Sibu, in the state of Sarawak
 Lin Shu (1852–1924), scholar and translator, most famous for his translation of Alexandre Dumas' La Dame aux Camélias
 Yan Fu (1854–1921), scholar and translator, best known for introducing western ideas such as Darwinian evolution
 Huang Jun (1890–1937), writer
 Lin Sen (1868–1943), President of the Republic of China from 1931 to 1943
 Sa Shijun (1896–1938), high-ranking naval officer of Mongolian origin
 Liu Buchan (1852–1895), naval officer of the Beiyang Fleet, the most prominent of China's naval units in the late Qing Dynasty
 Lin Zexu (1785–1850), scholar and official, considered a national hero for his strong opposition to the trade of opium before the First Anglo-Chinese War
 Hsien Wu (1893–1959), protein scientist
 Shen Baozhen (1820–1879), Viceroy of Liangjiang from 1875 to 1879
 Hou Debang (1890–1974), chemical engineer
 Lu Yin (廬隱, 1898–1934), writer
 Hu Yepin (胡也頻, 1903–1931), writer
 Zhu Qianzhi (1899–1972), intellectual, translator and historian
 Zhang Yuzhe (1902–1986), astronomer and director of the Purple Mountain Observatory
 Shu Chun Teng (1902–1970), mycologist
 Fan Tchunpi, painter and ceramicist
 Watchman Nee (1903–1972), Christian author and church leader
 Deng Tuo (1911–1966),  poet, intellectual and journalist
 Liang Shoupan (1916–2009), aerospace engineer and regarded as the "father of China's cruise missile program"
 Xiao Guangyan (1920–1968), chemical engineer
 Wu Mengchao (1922–2021), medical scientist
 Chen Jingrun (1933–1996), mathematician who made significant contributions to number theory
 Chen Zhangliang (born 1962), biologist, elected as vice-governor of Guangxi in 2007
 Lin Jiaqiao (林家翹, 1916–2013), well-known mathematician
 Shen-su Sun (1943–2005), geochemist
 Chen Kaige (born 1952), film director
 Miao Hua (born 1955), PLA Navy admiral and Director of the Political Work Department of the Central Military Commission
 Chen Pao-yu (born 1958), Chief of Staff of the Taiwanese Army
 Vanessa Shih (born 1962), Taiwanese diplomat
 Chen Haomin (1969–present), Hong Kong actor and singer
 Kelly Lin (born 1973), Taiwanese actress and model
 Lin Chi-ling (born 1974), Taiwanese actress and model
 Jimmy Lin (born 1974), Taiwanese singer, actor, and race car driver
 Chiang Tsu-ping (born 1978), Taiwanese actress and television host
 Yao Jinnan (born 1995), artistic gymnast who represented China at the London 2012 Olympic Games
 Eugene A. Coffin (1888–1972), rear admiral in the United States Coast Guard
Zhou Zihe (周子和, 1874–1926), possible shifu of Uechi Kanbun, founder of Uechi Ryū
 Sister Ping (real name: Cheng Chui Ping, 郑翠萍/鄭翠萍, 1949–2014), Chinese convicted human smuggler and snakehead
 Ludi Lin (born 1987), Chinese-Canadian actor and model
 Jony J (born 1989), rapper and songwriter
 Xu Bin (born 1989), actor and singer

Education

Colleges and universities

 Fujian Normal University (founded in 1907)
 Fuzhou University (founded in 1958)
 Fujian Agriculture and Forestry University (founded in 1958)
Three Universities above take the leading position in the province, and they are supported by Fujian Government to build High-level University.
 Fujian Medical University
 Fujian University of Traditional Chinese Medicine
 Minjiang University
 Fujian University of Technology
 Fujian Police College 
 Fujian Commercial College
 Fijian Jiangxia University
Note: Institutions without full-time bachelor programs are not listed.

High schools
 Fuzhou No.8 Middle School
 Fuzhou Foreign Language School
 Fuzhou Gezhi High School
 Fuzhou No.1 Middle School
 Fuzhou No.3 Middle School
 Fuzhou Senior High School
 Fuzhou No.4 Middle School
 Fuzhou No.2 Middle School
 The Affiliated High School Of Fujian Normal University
 Fuzhou Pingdong Middle School

See also

 Nantai Island
 List of cities in the People's Republic of China by population
 List of twin towns and sister cities in China
 Fuzhounese people
 Fuzhou language
 Fujian

References

Sources

 A Brief History of The Sino-Japanese War (1937–1945), Hu Pu-yu, (Chung Wu Publishing Co. Taipei, Taiwan, Republic of China, 1974) pg 142.
 China at War 1901–1949, Edward L. Dreyer, (Longman, London and New York, 1995) pg 235.
 Australia's China, Changing Perceptions from the 1930s to the 1990s, Lachlan Strachan, (Cambridge University Press 1996) pg 107.
 Bomb, Book & Compass, Joseph Needham and the Great Secrets of China, Simon Winchester, (Penguin *Group Australia, Camberwell, Victoria) pp 143–151.
 op.cit.
 
 wesleyan.edu
 indiana.edu
 politics.people.com.cn

External links

 Fuzhou Government website
 Introduction to Fuzhou and local news  on China Daily website 
Fuzhou Places to visit .
Fuzhou News Net
Fuzhou Municipal Television Station
 An early history of Fujian and Fuzhou 
 
 Maritime Art – On the River Min
 Fuzhou Daily, Fuzhou Evening News and its Overseas Edition, the local newspapers
 Historic US Army map of Fuzhou, 1945

 
Cities in Fujian
Prefecture-level divisions of Fujian
Provincial capitals in China